Baker Boys may refer to:

 Baker Boys: Inside the Surge, a 2010 documentary series
 Baker Boys (2011 TV series), a BBC TV Series
 Baker Boys (Thai TV series), a 2021 television adaptation of the manga Antique Bakery

See also
 Baker Boy (born 1996), an Indigenous Australian musician and actor
 The Fabulous Baker Boys, a 1989 film